The  is a rapid transit electric multiple unit (EMU) train type operated by the Transportation Bureau City of Nagoya on the Nagoya Subway Sakura-dōri Line in Japan since July 2010.

The design is based on the earlier 6000 series trains.

Formation
Trainsets are formed as follows.

Cars 2, 3, and 4 are each fitted with one single-arm pantograph.

References

External links

 Official description 
 Manufacturer's Description 

Electric multiple units of Japan
6050 series
Train-related introductions in 2010
Nippon Sharyo multiple units
1500 V DC multiple units of Japan